Nepal’s three main security agencies – Nepal Army, Armed Police Force Nepal and Nepal Police contribute to UN peacekeeping. Civilian administrators and technical staff from Nepal also participate in UN peace operations both on an individual basis and when seconded from the government. Nepal is the 2nd largest contributors of troops towards UN peacekeeping efforts after Bangladesh UN Peacekeeping Force.

The Nepalese Army in UN Peacekeeping Operations

References

Nepal
Military of Nepal
Nepal
Nepal and the United Nations